Meeniyan was a railway station on the South Gippsland line in South Gippsland, Victoria. The station was opened during the 1890s and operated until 1992 when the line to Barry Beach servicing the oil fields in Bass Strait was closed. The line was dismantled and turned into the Great Southern Rail Trail.

The station grounds still retain a Pivot Shed, Goods platform, and the platform mound in reasonable condition, along with a mile marker 88 and a buffer stop in good condition.

Disused railway stations in Victoria (Australia)
Transport in Gippsland (region)
Shire of South Gippsland